Lieutenant Commander Drummond St Clair Ford (16 December 1907 – 12 December 1942) was a Scottish international rugby union player, who was killed in World War II.

He also played for United Services Portsmouth Rugby Football Club and Royal Navy Rugby Union.

See also
 List of Scottish rugby union players killed in World War II

Sources
 Bath, Richard (ed.) The Scotland Rugby Miscellany (Vision Sports Publishing Ltd, 2007 )
 Massie, Allan A Portrait of Scottish Rugby (Polygon, Edinburgh)

References

External links
 Player profile on scrum.com

1907 births
1942 deaths
Royal Navy officers of World War II
Royal Navy personnel killed in World War II
Royal Navy rugby union players
Scotland international rugby union players
Scottish rugby union players
Royal Navy officers
Scottish military personnel